Clara Hamilton Harris (September 4, 1834 – December 23, 1883) was an American socialite. She and her fiancé Major Henry Rathbone were the guests of President Abraham Lincoln and First Lady Mary Lincoln when John Wilkes Booth shot the president at Ford's Theatre in April 1865.

Early life and family
Harris was born in Albany, New York, one of four children of U.S. Senator Ira Harris of New York, and his first wife Louisa Harris (née Tubbs). Harris' mother Louisa died in 1845. On August 1, 1848, Ira Harris married Pauline Rathbone (née Penney), the widow of Jared L. Rathbone, a successful merchant who later became the mayor of Albany. Jared and Pauline Rathbone had four children (two of whom, Anna and Charles, died in infancy) including sons, Jared, Jr. and Henry Rathbone.

Although Harris and Henry Rathbone were raised in the same household and were related by their parents' marriage, they fell in love and later became engaged. Their engagement was interrupted when the American Civil War broke out in 1861 and Henry Rathbone joined the Union Army that year and became major in 1869 upon joining the 5th United States Infantry.

Lincoln assassination

On April 14, 1865, Major Rathbone and his fiancée Clara accepted an invitation to see a play at Ford's Theatre from President Abraham Lincoln and his wife, First Lady Mary Todd Lincoln. The couple, who had been friends with the President and his wife for some time, were invited after Ulysses S. Grant and his wife Julia, Thomas Eckert and several other people had declined Mrs. Lincoln's invitation to the play.

While they watched the play Our American Cousin in the Presidential Box at Ford's Theatre that evening, John Wilkes Booth fatally shot President Lincoln in the back of the head. When Rathbone attempted to apprehend Booth after the shooting, Booth slashed Rathbone with a dagger from left elbow to shoulder.  Rathbone lost a considerable amount of blood which stained Harris' white dress, face and hands when she attempted to aid him.

Despite being seriously wounded, Rathbone escorted First Lady Mary Lincoln to the Petersen House where doctors had decided to take the mortally wounded President. Shortly after arriving at the Petersen House, Rathbone passed out due to loss of blood. Harris arrived at the house soon after and held Rathbone's head in her lap while he drifted in and out of consciousness. A surgeon who had been attending the President finally examined Rathbone and realized his wound was more serious than initially thought. Booth had severed an artery located just above Rathbone's elbow and had cut him nearly to the bone. Rathbone was taken home while Harris decided to stay with Mrs. Lincoln. Harris later stated:

Poor Mrs. Lincoln, all through that dreadful night would look at me with horror & scream, 'oh! my husband's blood, my dear husband's blood'...It was Henry's blood, not the president's, but explanations were pointless.

While Rathbone eventually recovered from the attack, President Lincoln died of his wound the following morning. After the assassination, Rathbone blamed himself for not preventing Lincoln's death. He spent the remainder of his life battling delusions and seeking treatments for other physical problems including constant headaches.

Later years and death
Harris and Rathbone were married on July 11, 1867. The couple had three children: Henry Riggs (born February 12, 1870), who later became a U.S. Congressman from Illinois, Gerald Lawrence (born August 26, 1871) and Clara Pauline (born September 15, 1872).  Rathbone, who had risen to the rank of colonel, resigned from the Army in December 1870. The family settled in Washington D.C., where Rathbone's mental health deteriorated.  Rathbone's behavior became increasingly erratic and he began drinking heavily, gambling and having affairs. Due to his behavior, Rathbone found it difficult to hold a job for an extended period of time.

Every year on the anniversary of Lincoln's assassination, journalists would contact the couple with questions about Lincoln's death, furthering Rathbone's feelings of guilt. Harris later wrote to a friend:

I understand his distress...in every hotel we're in, as soon as people get wind of our presence, we feel ourselves become objects of morbid scrutiny.... Whenever we were in the dining room, we began to feel like zoo animals. Henry...imagines that the whispering is more pointed and malicious than it can possibly be.

As time went on, Rathbone's mental instability worsened and he often became jealous of other men who paid attention to Harris and resented the attention Harris paid their children. He also reportedly threatened his wife on several occasions, convinced that Harris was going to divorce him and take the children. Despite his behavior, Rathbone was appointed U.S. Consul to the Province of Hanover by President Chester Alan Arthur in 1882. The family relocated to Germany where Rathbone's mental health continued to decline.

On December 23, 1883, Henry Rathbone attacked his family in a fit of madness. He fatally shot his wife in the head and then attempted to kill the children, but a groundskeeper prevented him from doing so. Rathbone then stabbed himself five times in the chest in an attempted suicide. Blaming his crime on an intruder, Rathbone was charged with murder and declared insane by doctors. He was convicted and committed to an asylum for the criminally insane in Hildesheim, Germany, where he died on August 14, 1911. The couple's children were sent to live with their uncle, William Harris, in the United States.

Harris was buried in the city cemetery at Hanover/Engesohde. Her husband was buried next to her upon his death in 1911. In 1952, the 
Rathbones' remains were disinterred and their remains disposed of in accordance with the German cemetery's policies i.e. the couple's surviving family lived overseas and could not regularly tend their graves.

In popular culture
 Clara Harris kept the bloodied white dress she wore on the night of assassination. Unable to bring herself to wash or destroy it, she eventually stored it in a closet in the family's summer home near Albany. After experiencing what she claimed was a visit from Lincoln's ghost, Harris had the closet in which the dress was stored covered with bricks. In 1910, Henry Riggs Rathbone, Harris and Rathbone's eldest son, removed the bricks and had the dress destroyed reportedly claiming that it had cursed the family. The dress was later the subject of the 1929 book The White Satin Dress, by Mary Raymond Shipman Andrews.
 In 1994, Thomas Mallon released the novel Henry and Clara, a fictional account of the lives of Harris and her husband.
 Harris was portrayed by actress Mercedes Herrero in the made-for-television film The Day Lincoln Was Shot, by actress Eleanor Perkinson in the made-for-television film Killing Lincoln, and by uncredited actresses in two films pertaining to the Lincoln assassination, The Conspirator and National Treasure: Book of Secrets.

References

External links

 

 A Case of Mistaken Identity of the most Famous Photo of Clara Harris

1834 births
1883 murders in Europe
1883 deaths
American expatriates in Germany
American people murdered abroad
American socialites
Burials in Lower Saxony
Deaths by firearm in Germany
People associated with the assassination of Abraham Lincoln
People from Albany, New York
People murdered in Germany
Women in the American Civil War